is a former Japanese footballer who last played for Fujieda MYFC.

Club statistics
Updated to 23 February 2017.

References

External links

Profile at Fujieda MYFC

1989 births
Living people
Shizuoka Sangyo University alumni
Association football people from Miyagi Prefecture
Japanese footballers
J3 League players
Japan Football League players
Fujieda MYFC players
Association football defenders